Lovesick (formerly known as Scrotal Recall) is a British sitcom created by Tom Edge which was first broadcast on Channel 4 in October 2014 and stars Johnny Flynn, Antonia Thomas, Daniel Ings, Hannah Britland and Joshua McGuire. After the show was originally aired on Channel 4, it was made available by Netflix, who then commissioned a second season globally on 17 November 2016, where it was billed as a Netflix Original. The show was renewed for a third season, which was released exclusively on Netflix on 1 January 2018.

Plot
The show revolves around a group of university friends sharing a house in the West End of Glasgow and their romantic lives. After Dylan Witter (Flynn) is diagnosed with chlamydia, he attempts to contact all of his previous sexual partners to inform them of his diagnosis. Dylan lives with best friends Luke Curran (Ings) and Evie Douglas (Thomas), the latter of whom previously harboured a secret crush on Dylan, but has since moved on, recently becoming engaged. The majority of each episode is told through flashback, showing Dylan's encounters with a number of women, as well as the changes his friends go through.

The third season, released in January 2018, focuses more on Dylan, Evie and Luke's relationships with each other, and Angus's (McGuire) own personal problems.

Cast

Main

Johnny Flynn as Dylan Witter, the protagonist of the show. He is a vaguely inept romantic who goes from one casual relationship to another, usually expecting more than there is to offer. He works in landscaping, as a garden designer and previously briefly worked as a barista. Luke refers to him as "Dyl" or "Dildo". His parents Julian (Tony Gardner) and Janie (Siobhan Redmond) appear in season three.
Antonia Thomas as Evelyn "Evie" Douglas, Dylan and Luke's best friend. She is barbed, sarcastic and usually single. She appears to have underlying feelings for Dylan, although these are confused by the situation between them. Evie works as an illustrator and photographer. She is engaged to Mal throughout the first and second series.
Daniel Ings as Luke Curran, best friend and flatmate of Dylan and Evie. He is feckless, irresponsible and shallow, however he has a strong affection for his friends and often goes out of his own way to help them. Luke works as an app developer for a company called Volcano Media. His mother is seen in a photograph in the series one episode “Cressida”, particularly because Luke and his mum previously shared the same haircut.
Hannah Britland as Abigail Saunders, the barmaid at Angus and Helen's wedding, and one of Dylan's former lovers. After he contacts her to inform her of his diagnosis, they resume their casual relationship. Although not her main employment, throughout the series she is a writer who wishes to have a career in storytelling.
Joshua McGuire as Angus Baker, a friend of Dylan, Luke and Evie's from university. He is slightly childish but appears to be the most academic member of the group with a background in mathematics.
Richard Thomson as Malcolm "Mal", Evie's fiancé. He is introduced as a friend of Anna's. A former soldier, Mal is a Police Constable and uses this to his advantage to help Evie and her friends. Mal has a nut allergy which is highlighted when Evie accidentally feeds him pine kernels on Valentine’s Day. His parents Fiona (Deborah Findlay) and Richard (Karl Johnson) feature in the episode “Jonesy”. Despite being set in Glasgow, Thomson is the only Scottish actor in the main cast of the series. 
Klariza Clayton as Holly, a stripper who meets Angus and the group on her first day in the strip club. After a lap dance, she develops a relationship with Angus.
Yasmine Akram as Maria "Jonesy" Jones, a bubbly and vivacious friend of the group from university. She has a strict no-relationship policy.

Recurring
Susannah Fielding as Phoebe Morris, Dylan's date to a quiz-night who he realises is the female equivalent of Luke. Although Phoebe was dating Dylan at the time, Luke has a deep affection for her, which continues in series 3. Phoebe dies almost five years after her relationship with Dylan ended from an unknown cause and this greatly affects Luke.
Riann Steele as Cleo, a short-term girlfriend of Luke's, who goes on to become his therapist.
Jamie Demetriou as Samuels, Luke's workmate in app development at Volcano Media. He is gifted with exceptional memory, often recalling Luke's past mistakes. He appears to have a close and supportive friendship with both Luke and McNeish.
Turlough Convery as McNeish, a colleague of Luke's. He seems friendly but laddish, to the point of offering a principal investor in his company MDMA.
Laura Aikman as Jo, Luke's ex-girlfriend whose break-up with him deeply affected him.
Stephen Wight as Jonno, one of Luke's former co-workers as an app developer. He usually introduces himself with "I'm Jonno."
Jessica Ellerby as Jane Ansell, a short-term, sexually permissive former girlfriend of Dylan's three and a half years before his diagnosis.
Aimee Parkes as Helen, the domineering wife of Angus. She seems to love Angus despite her personality, and Angus feels her anger is caused by her belief that he does not love her equally.

Dylan's list
Hannah Britland as Abigail 
Nikki Amuka-Bird as Anna
Natalie Burt as Cressida
Jessica Ellerby as Jane Ansell
Rosalie Craig as Bethany
Susannah Fielding as Phoebe Morris
Antonia Clarke as Frankie
Katrine De Candole as Agata
Jade Ogugua as Amy Douglas
Jenny Bede as Isabel
Cassie Layton as Emma
Yasmine Akram as Maria Jones
Claudia Jessie as Tasha

Other appearances
James Martin as Dylan’s neighbour
Cara Theobold as Ilona
Kevin O'Loughlin as Charlie
Duncan Pow as Gareth
David Westhead as Alexander
Karl Johnson as Richard
Deborah Findlay as Fiona
Ian Kelsey as James Hamilton
Pearce Quigley as Simon
Tony Gardner as Julian Witter
Siobhan Redmond as Janie Witter
Melanie Hudson as Martha Wells
Paul Ritter as Peter

Episodes

Series 1 (2014)

Series 2 (2016)

Series 3 (2018)

Production

The first series was made available on Netflix in the United States in April 2015 and was billed as a "Netflix Original". The show found enough success on the site that Netflix went on to commission a second series of 8 episodes, without Channel 4's involvement. The second series debuted globally on the streaming network in November 2016.

Lovesick was filmed in numerous locations in and around Glasgow, Scotland.
 Most outdoor scenes were filmed in the West End of the city, and the series has featured Kelvingrove Park, the University of Glasgow and Partick. Despite the Glasgow location of the show, actor Richard Thomson (Mal) is the only main Scottish actor in the series.

Name change
After its transfer from Channel 4 to Netflix, the show was renamed from Scrotal Recall to Lovesick. Antonia Thomas noted that while the former name technically made sense, it completely mis-sold the tone of the show. Thomas admitted to being pleased with the name change, and noted that the second series would continue to follow the same format as the first, but would go more in-depth.

Reception 
Lovesick received critical acclaim for its storyline and acting performances.
The review aggregator Rotten Tomatoes gave the series an average score of 97%, based on 27 total reviews among the three seasons. Paste magazine said "This honest approach is refreshing in a world of sitcoms focusing on wealthy lads and ladies moving from their college dorms straight into Manhattan lofts and prosperous careers. Lovesick is all about keeping it real."

References

External links

Scrotal Recall (Archived 25/11/2016) at Channel 4

2014 British television series debuts
2018 British television series endings
2010s British romance television series
2010s British sitcoms
2010s British romantic comedy television series
Channel 4 sitcoms
English-language Netflix original programming
Television shows about diseases and disorders
Television series by Clerkenwell Films
Television shows set in Glasgow